The Tour of the Netherlands (Dutch: Ronde van Nederland) was a road bicycle racing stage-race in the Netherlands, founded in 1948. 

It was an annual race since 1975. Because of the start of the UCI ProTour in 2005, it was replaced by the Eneco Tour.

The first edition started on April 24, from Dam Square, Amsterdam. The riders finished on May 1st, nine days later, in the Olympisch Stadion.

The competition's roll of honor includes the successes of Rik Van Looy, Jan Janssen, Joop Zoetemelk and Laurent Fignon. The record of victories belongs to Gerrie Knetemann.

Winners

External links

 History

References 

 
Cycle races in the Netherlands
Defunct cycling races in the Netherlands
Recurring sporting events established in 1948
1948 establishments in the Netherlands
Recurring sporting events disestablished in 2004
Men's road bicycle races
2004 disestablishments in the Netherlands